Isfara District or Nohiya-i Isfara is a former district at the northeastern edge of Sughd Region, Tajikistan, bordering on Uzbekistan's Ferghana Valley to the north and Kyrgyzstan to the south. Its capital was Isfara. Vorukh, an enclave surrounded by Kyrgyzstan, is also part of Isfara. Around 2018, it was merged into the city of Isfara.

Administrative divisions
The district was divided administratively into jamoats. They were as follows (and population).

References

External links
Habib Borjian, "Esfara", in Encyclopaedia Iranica, Columbia University (enter keyword "Esfara" in search field to access the article).

Former districts of Tajikistan
Sughd Region